Masoala National Park, in northeast Madagascar, is the largest of the island's protected areas. Most of the park is situated in Sava Region and a part in Analanjirofo. Created in 1997, the park protects 2,300 square kilometres of rainforest and 100 square kilometres of marine parks. The Masoala Peninsula is exceptionally diverse due to its large size, and variety of habitats. Altogether, the park protects tropical rainforest, coastal forest, flooded forest, marsh, and mangrove. Three marine parks protect coral reefs and a dazzling array of marine life.

Climate
This is an exceptionally wet area of Madagascar. The driest part of the year is from September to December. As the park is accessible only by a three-hour boat journey, the cyclone season (January to March) is best avoided.

Flora and fauna
There are ten lemur species, including the red ruffed lemur, which is native to the peninsula.  The island reserve of Nosy Mangabe is one of the best sites in Madagascar to try to glimpse the elusive nocturnal aye-aye.

Masoala harbors many other species, such as the Madagascar day gecko, leaf-tailed gecko, chameleons of all sizes, spectacular birds such as the helmet vanga, and rare species such as the red owl and tomato frog. Masoala is also home to the day-flying sunset moth, Chrysiridia rhipheus. The Madagascar serpent-eagle was recently rediscovered here, and exists in healthy populations only in this part of northeast Madagascar.

The tree Ephippiandra masoalensis is endemic to the park.

Three marine parks are included in the Masoala National Park: Tampolo in the West, Ambodilaitry in the South, and Ifaho in the East. These are among the most diverse marine environments in Madagascar and are superb destinations for kayaking and snorkeling. 

Each year from July to early September, hundreds of humpback whales visit the Antongil Bay during their long migration.  The warm protected waters of the bay provide an ideal breeding and calving ground for these marine mammals.

Conservation and threats
In June 2007, Masoala was designated as a World Heritage Site as part of a cluster of parks, known collectively as Rainforests of the Atsinanana, that represent the biodiversity of the country's eastern rainforests. The other national parks included are Marojejy, Zahamena, Ranomafana, Andringitra, and Andohahela.

During 2009 and 2010, the national park was invaded by thousands of illegal loggers searching for rosewood.

See also
 Antongil Bay
 Illegal logging in Madagascar
 National parks of Madagascar
 Masoala, Madagascar

References

External links
 Masoala National Park official site
 Trouble in Lemur Land- a professional 50-minute HD film about illegal rosewood logging in Madagascar and the impact on the silky sifaka lemur
 Human Rights Issues, see www.humanrightsmasoala.org

National parks of Madagascar
Sava Region
Analanjirofo
Protected areas established in 1997
1997 establishments in Madagascar
Madagascar lowland forests
Important Bird Areas of Madagascar